John Borland Thayer III (December 24, 1894 – September 20, 1945) was a first-class passenger on  who survived after the ship struck an iceberg and sank on April 15, 1912. Aged 17 at the time, he was one of only a handful of passengers to survive jumping into the frigid sea. He later wrote and privately published his recollection of the sinking.

Early life 
He was born into the Thayer family, a wealthy Boston Brahmin family. He was the son of John Borland Thayer II, a director and a second vice president of the Pennsylvania Railroad Company and his wife, Philadelphia socialite Marian Thayer.

Aboard Titanic 

Seventeen-year-old Thayer had been traveling in Europe with his parents and a maid named Margaret Fleming. Jack's stateroom, cabin C-70, adjoined his parents', C-68. Shortly after 11:40 p.m., after the ship collided with the iceberg, he dressed and went to a deck on the port side to see what had happened. Finding nothing, he walked to the bow, where he could faintly make out ice on the forward well deck.

Thayer woke his parents, who accompanied him back to the port side of the ship. Noticing that the ship was beginning to list to port, they returned to their rooms to put on warmer clothes and life vests. They returned to the deck, but Thayer lost sight of his parents. After a brief search, he presumed they had boarded a lifeboat. Thayer soon met Milton Long, a fellow passenger he had met just hours before. Both Long and Thayer attempted to board a lifeboat, but were turned away due to the policy of boarding women and children first. Thayer proposed jumping off the ship, as he was a good swimmer, but as Long was not, he initially opposed jumping.

As the ship began listing more, the two men went ahead with attempting to jump off the side, intending to swim to safety. Long went first, jumping while facing the ship, and was never seen again. Thayer launched himself from the rail, his back facing the ship, and pushing outward. Once in the water, Thayer was able to reach Collapsible B, one of the last lifeboats to be launched; it was also overturned as a large wave had swept it off the deck before it could be lowered into the water. He and other crew and passengers, including Junior Wireless Officer Harold Bride, Colonel Archibald Gracie IV, Chief Baker Charles Joughin, and Second Officer Charles Lightoller (who was the most senior surviving crew member), were able to keep the overturned boat steady for some hours. Thayer later recalled that the cries of hundreds of people in the water reminded him of the high-pitched hum of locusts in his native Pennsylvania.

After spending the night on the overturned Collapsible B, Thayer was pulled to safety into Lifeboat 12. He was so distraught and frozen that he did not notice his mother in nearby Lifeboat 4; nor did she notice him. Thayer's father did not board a lifeboat and perished in the sinking. Thayer was one of about 40 persons who jumped or fell into the water and survived.

In his privately published 1940 account of the sinking, Thayer recalled what life was like before the Titanic sank, "There was peace and the world had an even tenor to its way. Nothing was revealed in the morning the trend of which was not known the night before. It seems to me that the disaster about to occur was the event that not only made the world rub its eyes and awake but woke it with a start keeping it moving at a rapidly accelerating pace ever since with less and less peace, satisfaction and happiness. To my mind the world of today awoke April 15th, 1912".

Later life
Thayer went on to graduate from the University of Pennsylvania, where he was a member of the fraternity Saint Anthony Hall. On December 15, 1917, Thayer married Lois Buchanan Cassatt, daughter of Edward B. Cassatt and Emily L. Phillips. Her grandfather was Alexander Johnston Cassatt, President of the Pennsylvania Railroad. The couple had two sons, Edward Cassatt and John Borland IV, and three daughters: Lois, Julie, and Pauline. A third son, Alexander Johnston Cassatt Thayer, died a few days after his birth in 1920.  During World War I, he served as an artillery officer in the U.S Army. 

During World War II, both of Thayer's sons enlisted in the armed services. Edward, a bomber pilot, was listed as missing and presumed dead after his plane was shot down in 1943 in the Pacific theatre. His body was never recovered. When the news reached Thayer, he became extremely depressed.

In 1939, Thayer became treasurer of the University of Pennsylvania, and was appointed to the newly created office of financial vice president in February 1944, a position he held until his death in September 1945.

Thayer's mother Marian died on April 14, 1944, on the 32nd anniversary of  collision and sinking. Her death seemed to push him even further into a downward spiral, and he died by suicide on September 20, 1945. He was found in an automobile at 48th Street and Parkside Ave in West Philadelphia, his throat and wrists cut. He was buried at the Church of the Redeemer Cemetery in Bryn Mawr, Pennsylvania.

Titanic accounts
Oceanographer Robert Ballard used Thayer's account to help determine the final resting place of the shipwreck. The discovery helped prove that the ship had split in half before sinking. Thayer, among many other survivors, including crew members, reported it breaking into two pieces, but others reported it sinking in one piece, and the question remained unsettled until the wreck was found.

Thayer's account is sometimes included with fellow survivor Archibald Gracie IV's account of the sinking, in modern editions of Gracie's book Titanic: A Survivor's Story.

Further reading
 Titanic: A Survivor's Story and the Sinking of the S.S. Titanic by Archibald Gracie IV and Jack Thayer, Academy Chicago Publishers, 1988 
 Titanic: Triumph and Tragedy, by John P. Eaton and Charles A. Haas, W.W. Newton & Company, 2nd edition 1995 
 A Night to Remember, by Walter Lord, ed. Nathaniel Hilbreck, Owl Books, rep. 2004,

See also
 Passengers of the RMS Titanic

References

External links
 Encyclopedia Titanica article on John Borland Thayer III
 John B. Thayer memorial collection of the Sinking of the Titanic Kislak Center for Special Collections, Rare Books and Manuscripts, University of Pennsylvania
 Jack Thayer on Find A Grave

1894 births
1945 suicides
RMS Titanic survivors
People from Philadelphia
Suicides by sharp instrument in the United States
Suicides in Philadelphia
Thayer family
University of Pennsylvania alumni
University of Pennsylvania faculty
United States Army personnel of World War I